Sam Benjamin "Shir Yaakov" Feinstein-Feit (born February 27, 1978)  is an American rabbi, composer, liturgist, singer and graphic designer. He currently serves Kol Hai, a Jewish Renewal community based in New Paltz, New York. He received rabbinical ordination in January 2020 from Aleph: Alliance for Jewish Renewal, the Jewish Renewal umbrella organization formed under the spiritual guidance of Rabbi Zalman Schachter-Shalomi during the 1990s.

Since 2015, Shir Yaakov has led Kol Hai. From 2008 to 2012, he served as Musical Director at Romemu, the Manhattan congregation led by Rabbi David Ingber, who was also a student of Schachter-Shalomi. Earlier still, Shir Yaakov co-founded and led the Kol Zimrah minyan on the Upper West Side of Manhattan.

While he records and performs primarily as a singer-songwriter, he has also worked with Darshan and The Epichorus. In 2016, his song "Broken-Hearted", based on a verse from Psalm 147, won first place in the 2016 Soundtrack of our Spirit competition organized by the venerable Jewish-American media company The Forward. A number of his compositions remain in regular liturgical use at Romemu and other congregations in the US.

Feit's graphic design talents have been employed to design prayerbooks now in use at Romemu. He has also done the CD art (and lyric booklets) for Darshan's CD's.

He is married and the father of three daughters.

Early life
Feit was raised in Manhattan by a secular Jewish family. He attended the Abraham Joshua Heschel School beginning in third grade when his mother got a job there. His family were members of the B'nai Jeshurun synagogue. As a child, Feit took piano and guitar lessons and taught himself music, including transcription and composition. In high school, he was influenced musically by Nirvana's Kurt Cobain.

After graduating high school, Feit worked in photography, graphic and web design. He started becoming more religious in his early 20s, influenced by Sefer Yetzirah and the works of Rabbi Zalman Schachter-Shalomi, the founder of the Jewish Renewal movement.

Feit moved to Jerusalem's Nachlaot neighborhood in 2005 to study in yeshiva. There, Feit and his friends created an informal band called Lev Yerushalayim, with whom he would beatbox and freestyle rap at late-night concerts outside Yeshivat Simchat Shlomo.

Music career

Solo albums
Feit began his music career with the EP Shir (2008), followed by his debut album Zeh (2009). He has since released two more solo albums, Az (2010) and Lah (2015).

Darshan

In 2008, while working at the Isabella Freedman Jewish Retreat Center, Feit met the Jewish rapper Eprhyme (Eden Pearlstein). After playing their respective music for each other, Eprhyme invited Feit to sing on his debut album Waywordwonderwill, and the two later formed the duo Darshan. Their debut EP Lishmah was released in 2010, followed by a full-length album, Deeper and Higher, in 2015.

Other
Feit has collaborated with the multifaith world music band The Epichorus, singing on their 2012 debut album One Bead.

Other activities
Feit is one of the founding members of Kol Zimrah, an independent minyan and chavurah on the Upper West Side. He has also founded and worked with the Jewish Renewal congregations Kol Hai and Romemu, and has served as a ritual consultant at Eden Village Camp and visiting faculty at the Academy for Jewish Religion.

Discography

As featured artist
Solo
Shir EP ("Song") (2008)
Zeh ("This") (2009)
Az ("Then") (2010)
Lah ("To Her") (2015)

With Darshan
Lishmah EP (2010; Shemspeed)
Deeper and Higher (2015)

Other
 Blanket Statementstein, Blanket Statementstein (2008) – vocals ("Never Stress")
 Eprhyme, Waywordwonderwill (2009) – vocals ("Tikkun Adam" and "Fixing Midnight")
 Eprhyme, Dopestylevsky (2011) – vocals (with Darshan) ("Better in the Dark")
 The Epichorus, One Bead (2012) – vocals
 The Epichorus, Precession (2016) – choir vocals

References

American singer-songwriters
Jewish rappers
1978 births
Living people
Jewish Renewal
Jewish hip hop record producers
Jewish folk singers
21st-century American singers